The BSFA Awards are given every year by the British Science Fiction Association. The Best Novel award is open to any novel-length work of science fiction or fantasy that has been published in the UK for the first time in the previous year. Serialised novels are eligible, provided that the publication date of the concluding part is in the previous year. If a novel has been previously published elsewhere, but it hasn't been published in the UK until the previous year, it is eligible.

Winners and Shortlists

The ceremonies are named after the year that the eligible works were published, despite the awards being given out in the next year.

  *   Winners and joint winners

External links
 Official BSFA Awards website

References

Novel
Awards established in 1969
1969 establishments in the United Kingdom
British fiction awards
Fantasy awards
Science fiction awards